Senate elections were held in the Czech Republic on 7 and 8 October 2016, with a second round on 14 and 15 of October. The first round was held alongside regional elections and several municipal referendums, notably in a referendum in Brno on the location of the town's train station.

The governing coalition of the Czech Social Democratic Party (ČSSD), ANO 2011 and the Christian and Democratic Union (KDU-ČSL) retained a majority in the full Senate, with the KDU-ČSL making the largest gains, while the Social Democrats incurred the greatest losses, retaining only two of their twelve seats up for re-election. ANO 2011 won the first round with fourteen candidates advancing, but only three of them were elected, which was a disappointment to the party. The most successful opposition party was the centre-right Civic Democratic Party. It had 6 candidates advancing and four of them elected (including Zdeněk Nytra who ran as independent).

Electoral system
One third of the 81-member Senate is elected every two years, giving Senators six year terms. The seats are elected in single-member constituencies using the two-round system.

Results

Re-run in Most
On 10 November the results in Most District were annulled due to the illegitimacy of Alena Dernerová's candidature. A re-run of the vote was organised for 27–28 January 2017, in which Dernerová was elected in the first round. Voter turnout was only 12%.

References

 
Czech Republic
Senate
Senate elections in the Czech Republic
2017 elections in the Czech Republic
October 2016 events in Europe
January 2017 events in Europe